Futian District is one of the nine districts comprising the city of Shenzhen, China. The district is home to the government and Municipal Committee of Shenzhen, as well as the city's central business district (CBD).

Name
There are two theories concerning the origin of the district's name:
 From an inscription dating to the Song Dynasty (960–1297) which reads: "Lakes and mountains are blessed with fertile farmlands".
 Written records showing that people from Shangsha Village built houses in Songziling in 1192; their farmlands were cultivated in lattice shapes, which in Chinese is a homophone for "Futian" meaning "blessed fields".

History
Luohu District was established in April 1979, one month after Shenzhen was promoted to city status. Futian, and another area called Fucheng, became communes within the Luohu District.

Futian became part of the Shenzhen Special Economic Zone after it was designated in 1980. It then became a subdistrict under the district of Shangbu.

Futian, along with Nanshan, was promoted to district status in October 1990. The Shangbu district, which had governed the Futian subdistrict the previous decade, became a part of the Futian district. The district government was established on Shennan Middle Road.

Rapid urbanization occurred in the late 20th century; the agricultural land which once made up a vast majority of Luohu had shrunk to an area of only  by 2003.

Economy
The Central Business District (CBD) of Shenzhen is a planned development project that began in the early 1990s. Located within the Futian district, it comprises an area of 607 hectares. The four sides of the district are delineated by Binhe Dadao, Lianhua Road, Xinzhou Road and Caitian Road.

Many office high-rises and government buildings are located in the CBD, some of which are prominent buildings in Shenzhen, such as the Shenzhen City Hall (Civic Center), Shenzhen Library, Shenzhen Concert Hall, Shenzhen Development Bank building and the Shenzhen Convention and Exhibition Center. Located directly north of the CBD is Lianhuashan Park.

There are numerous skyscrapers in the CBD such as the SEG Tower, China Merchants Bank Tower, the twin towers of East Pacific Center, and the 600 m (1969 ft) Ping An Finance Center, which is the second tallest building in China and the fourth tallest in the world.

Wal-Mart China has its headquarters in Towers 2 and 3 of SZITIC Square in Futian District.

The headquarters of OnePlus is in the Tairan Building  in Chegongmiao , Futian District.

Everbright International has its Shenzhen Offices in Oriental Xintiandi Plaza in Futian District.

The hotel chain Vienna Hotels formerly had its headquarters in Lüjing Garden, Futian District.

Subdistricts

Transport

Shenzhen Metro
Futian is currently served by ten metro lines operated by Shenzhen Metro. These lines and their stations and connections are:

   – Science Museum , Huaqiang Road, Gangxia , Convention and Exhibition Center , Shopping Park , Xiangmihu, Chegongmiao   , Zhuzilin, Qiaocheng East
   – Shenkang, Antuo Hill , Qiaoxiang, Xiangmi, Xiangmei North, Jingtian , Lianhua West, Futian  , Civic Center , Gangxia North   , Huaqiang North , Yannan
   – Futian Bonded Area, Yitian, Shixia , Shopping Park , Futian  , Children's Palace , Lianhuacun , Huaxin , Tongxinling , Hongling 
   – Futian Checkpoint  (  via Lok Ma Chau), Fumin  , Convention and Exhibition Center , Civic Center , Children's Palace , Lianhua North, Shangmeilin 
   – Science Museum , Tongxinling , Sports Center, Bagualing , Hanling
   - Autuo Hill , Nonglin, Chegongmiao   , Shangsha, Shawei, Shixia , Huanggangcun, Fumin  , Huanggang Checkpoint, Chiwei, Huaqiang South, Huaqiang North , Huaxin , Huangmugang  , Bagualing , Hongling North 
   - Xiasha, Chegongmiao   , Xiangmei, Jingtian , Meijing, Xiameilin, Meicun, Shangmeilin , Maling , Hongling North , Yuanling, Hongling , Hongling South
   – Futian Checkpoint  (  via Lok Ma Chau), Fumin  , Gangxia , Gangxia North   , Lianhuacun , Donggualing, Maling 
   – Chegongmiao    , Futian  , Gangxia North   
   – Gangxia North   , Huangmugang

High-speed railway
Futian is currently served by the Futian Railway station, with the high speed rail from Guangzhou to Hong Kong.

Shopping centers
Central Walk Shopping Mall

The mall is located at the Convention and Exhibition Center metro station and features three levels of shopping, entertainment, and dining.

COCO Park

COCO Park is an upscale retail complex in Futian Central Business District. Aside from a shopping mall, it also features a popular street bar, large open public spaces and restaurants.

Huaqiangbei 

Huaqiangbei is known for its electronics market, the largest of its kind in China. It also offers a variety of men's and women's fashions, shoes, bags and leather goods.

Education

There are now 83 schools delivering primary and secondary education holding 111,982 students and 11,503 teaching staff. Futian is also home to 140 kindergartens.

Secondary schools
Secondary schools (in Chinese the term "中学", literally meaning "middle school", is used, and often they are called "middle schools" in English in China) include those operated by the Shenzhen municipal government and by the Futian district government.

Schools operated by the Shenzhen municipal government in Futian District include:
Shenzhen Senior High School - Central Campus (中心校区) and the South Campus (南校区)
Shenzhen Experimental School
Shenzhen Foreign Languages School Junior High School Division
Shenzhen No. 3 Senior High School (深圳市第三高级中学) Junior High School Division
Shenzhen Arts School (深圳艺术学校) - Baishaling
The First Vocational Technical School of Shenzhen (深圳市第一职业技术学校)
Shenzhen Pengcheng Technical College (深圳鹏城技师学院), previously Shenzhen Second Senior Technical School - Fuqiang and Qiaocheng campuses

Schools operated by the Futian District government include:
 - In 2018 it had about 2,600 students. It has a  campus.
Shenzhen Fujing Foreign Language School - It was created in April 1999 and in 2018 it had over 2,000 students.
Shenzhen Futian BeiHuan Middle School
Futian Foreign Languages High School
Hongling Middle School
Shenzhen Futian Huafu Middle School
Shenzhen Futian Huanggang Middle School
 
Shenzhen Futian Meilin Middle School
Shenzhen Futian Meishan Middle School 
Shenzhen Futian Science Middle School
Shenzhen Futian Shangbu Middle School
Shenzhen Futian Shangsha Middle School
Shenzhen Futian Xinzhou Middle School
Shenzhen Yongyuan Experimental School (沪教院福田实验学校??)

Other:
Xinsha Middle School

International schools
Green Oasis School

QSI International School of Shenzhen previously had a campus in Honeylake, Futian District, adjacent to the Shenzhen Celebrities Club.

Higher education
Futian District is the location of the University of Hong Kong–Shenzhen Hospital, a municipally-funded public teaching hospital.

Immigration port of entry

One of the immigration control points that lies within Futian is known as the Futian Port. Its counterpart in Hong Kong is Lok Ma Chau Spur Line Control Point, connected through a pedestrian bridge. The port is served by Futian Checkpoint Station on the Shenzhen Metro, itself being located within the port building.

Another immigration checkpoint is located 150 m east of Futian Port. This is the only one of the six immigration checkpoints between Shenzhen and Hong Kong that is open 24 hours. The crossing is highway-only and used mostly by trucks and busses, with the mainland and Hong Kong crossings being on opposite sides of a bridge over the Shenzhen River. Its counterpart in Hong Kong is Lok Ma Chau Control Point. It also marks the terminus of the G4 Beijing–Hong Kong and Macau Expressway.

See also

Futian station
Yuanwang digital mall

Gallery

Notes

References

External links

 Futian Government Online 

 
Districts of Shenzhen